Bollore can refer to:

Companies
 Bolloré S.A., a listed French investment and industrial holding group
 Bolloré Investissement S.A., a French investment and industrial holding group, parent company of Bolloré S.A.

Surname

 Vincent Bolloré is a billionaire French industrialist, corporate raider, businessman and Chairman of Bolloré S.A.

See also 
 Espace Francophone pour la Recherche, le Développement et l'Innovation